Brett Gray (born August 7, 1996) is an American actor and singer. He is known for starring as Jamal Turner in the Netflix series On My Block and Dal R'El in the Paramount+/Nickelodeon animated series Star Trek: Prodigy.

Life and career 
Gray was born and raised in Philadelphia, Pennsylvania. He acted in his first school play at age 6, after which he performed in his first professional show at the Academy of Music when he was 7.

Gray attended The Philadelphia High School for Creative and Performing Arts as a Theater major, graduating in 2014.

After doing a chemistry read for the producers, Gray was offered the role of Jamal on On My Block (2018–2021). It is his first lead acting role. He was drawn to the role because he saw himself in Jamal. He stated in an interview with The Fader that he also hoped to expand his experience with physical comedy, a genre he previously had no experience with. Gray had a minor role in the 2019 Netflix limited series When They See Us.

Gray released his debut single, "Old Thing Back" in June 2018. His EP Easy Daze was released on his birthday on August 7, 2018. He compared the style to Usher's album Confessions.

Filmography

References

External links 

Brett Gray on Instagram

1997 births
Living people
American male film actors
American male television actors
American male voice actors
21st-century American male actors
21st-century American singers
African-American male actors
Male actors from Philadelphia
21st-century African-American male singers